Michael Witzel (born July 18, 1943) is a German-American philologist, comparative mythologist and Indologist. Witzel is the Wales Professor of Sanskrit at Harvard University and the editor of the Harvard Oriental Series (volumes 50–80).

Witzel is an authority on Indian sacred texts, particularly the Vedas, and Indian history. A critic of the arguments made by Hindutva writers and sectarian historical revisionism, he opposed some attempts to influence USA school curricula in the California textbook controversy over Hindu history.

Biographical information
Michael Witzel was born July 18, 1943, at Schwiebus in Germany (modern Świebodzin, Poland). He studied Indology in Germany (from 1965 to 1971) under Paul Thieme,  H.-P. Schmidt, K. Hoffmann and J. Narten, as well as in  Nepal (1972–1973) under the Mīmāmsaka Jununath Pandit. At Kathmandu (1972–1978), he led the Nepal-German Manuscript Preservation Project and the Nepal Research Centre.

He has taught at Tübingen (1972), Leiden (1978–1986), and at Harvard (since 1986), and has held visiting appointments at Kyoto (twice), Paris (twice), and Tokyo (twice). He has been teaching Sanskrit since 1972.

Witzel is editor-in-chief of the Electronic Journal of Vedic Studies (EJVS) and the Harvard Oriental Series. Witzel has been president of the Association for the Study of Language in Prehistory (ASLIP) since 1999, as well as of the new International Association for Comparative Mythology (2006-).

He was elected into the American Academy of Arts and Sciences in 2003, and was elected as an honorary member of the German Oriental Society (DMG) in 2009. He became Cabot Fellow, Faculty of Arts and Sciences, Harvard U. (2013), recognizing his book on comparative mythology (OUP, 2012)

Philological research
The main topics of scholarly research are the dialects of Vedic Sanskrit, old Indian history, the development of Vedic religion, and the linguistic prehistory of the Indian subcontinent.

Early works and translations
Witzel's early philological work deals with the oldest texts of India, the  Vedas, their manuscripts and their traditional recitation; it included some editions and translations of unknown texts (1972). such as the Katha Aranyaka. He has begun, together with T. Goto et al. a new translation of the Rigveda into German (Books I-II, 2007, Books III-V 2012)

Vedic texts, Indian history, and the emergence of the Kuru kingdom

After 1987, he has increasingly focused on the localization of Vedic texts (1987) and the evidence contained in them for early Indian history, notably that of the Rgveda and the following period, represented by the Black Yajurveda Samhitas and the Brahmanas. This work has been done in close collaboration with Harvard archaeologists such as R. Meadow, with whom he has also co-taught. Witzel aims at indicating the emergence of the Kuru tribe in the Delhi area (1989, 1995, 1997, 2003), its seminal culture and its political dominance, as well as studying the origin of late Vedic polities and the first Indian empire in eastern North India (1995, 1997, 2003, 2010).

He studied at length the various Vedic recensions (śākhā) and their importance for the geographical spread of Vedic culture across North India and beyond. This resulted in book-length investigations of Vedic dialects (1989), the development of the Vedic canon (1997), and of Old India as such (2003, reprint 2010).

Pre-Vedic substrate languages of Northern India
The linguistic aspect of earliest Indian history has been explored in a number of papers (1993, 1999, 2000, 2001, 2006, 2009) dealing with the pre-Vedic substrate languages of Northern India. These result in a substantial amount of loan words from a prefixing language ("Para-Munda") similar to but not identical with Austroasiatic (Munda, Khasi, etc.) as well as from  other unidentified languages. In addition, a considerable number of Vedic and Old Iranian words are traced back to a Central Asian substrate language (1999, 2003, 2004, 2006). This research is constantly updated, in collaboration with F. Southworth and D. Stampe, by the SARVA project including its South Asian substrate dictionary.

Comparative mythology
In recent years, he has explored the links between old Indian, Eurasian and other mythologies (1990, 2001–2010) resulting in a new scheme of historical comparative mythology that covers most of Eurasia and the Americas ("Laurasia", cf. the related Harvard, Kyoto, Beijing, Edinburgh, Ravenstein (Netherlands), Tokyo, Strasbourg, St.Petersburg, Tübingen, Yerevan conferences of IACM). This approach has been pursued in a number of papers. A book published in late 2012, The Origins of the World's Mythologies,  deals with the newly proposed method of historical comparative mythology at length; (for scholarly criticism see and for periodic updates see) It has been called a magnum opus, which should be taken seriously by social anthropologists, and was praised by professor of Sanskrit Frederick Smith, who wrote that

It also received criticism. Tok Thompson called it "racist" and dismissed it as "useless—and frustrating—for any serious scholar," while Bruce Lincoln concluded that Witzel in this publication theorizes "in terms of deep prehistory, waves of migration, patterns of diffusion, and contrasts between the styles of thought/narration he associates with two huge aggregates of the  world's population [which] strikes me as ill-founded, ill-conceived, unconvincing, and deeply disturbing in its implications."

Criticism of "Indigenous Aryans"

Witzel published  articles criticizing what he calls "spurious interpretations" of Vedic texts and decipherments of Indus inscriptions such as that of N.S. Rajaram.

Indus script
Witzel has questioned the linguistic nature of the so-called Indus script (Farmer, Sproat, Witzel 2004). Farmer, Sproat, and Witzel presented a number of arguments in support of their thesis that the Indus script is non-linguistic, principal among them being the extreme brevity of the inscriptions, the existence of too many rare signs increasing over the 700-year period of the Mature Harappan civilization, and the lack of random-looking sign repetition typical for representations of actual spoken language (whether syllable-based or letter-based), as seen, for example, in Egyptian cartouches.

Earlier, he had suggested that a substrate related to, but not identical with, the Austro-Asiatic Munda languages, which he, therefore, calls para-Munda, might have been the language of (part of) the Indus population.

Asko Parpola, reviewing the Farmer, Sproat, and Witzel thesis in 2005, states that their arguments "can be easily controverted". He cites the presence of a large number of rare signs in Chinese and emphasizes that there is "little reason for sign repetition in short seal texts written in an early logo-syllabic script". Revisiting the question in a 2007 lecture, Parpola takes on each of the 10 main arguments of Farmer et al., presenting counterarguments. He states that "even short noun phrases and incomplete sentences qualify as full writing if the script uses the rebus principle to phonetize some of its signs". All these points are rejected in a lengthy paper by Richard Sproat, "Corpora and Statistical Analysis of Non-Linguistic Symbol Systems" (2012).

Shorter papers
Shorter papers provide analyses of important religious (2004) and literary concepts of the period, and its Central Asian antecedents as well as  such as the oldest frame story (1986, 1987), prosimetric texts (1997), the Mahabharata (2005), the concept of rebirth (1984), the 'line of progeny' (2000), splitting one's head in discussion (1987), the holy cow (1991), the Milky Way (1984), the asterism of the Seven Rsis (1995, 1999), the sage Yajnavalkya (2003), supposed female Rishis in the Veda (2009,) the persistence of some Vedic beliefs, in modern Hinduism (1989 2002, with cultural historian Steve Farmer and John B. Henderson), as well as some modern Indocentric tendencies (2001-).

Other work (1976-) deals with the traditions of medieval and modern India and  Nepal,

 including its linguistic history, Brahmins, rituals, and kingship (1987) and present day culture, as well as with Old Iran and the Avesta (1972-), including its homeland in Eastern Iran and Afghanistan (2000).

Conferences
Witzel has organized a number of international conferences at Harvard such as the first of the intermittent International Vedic Workshops (1989,1999,2004; 2011 at Bucharest, 2014 at Kozhikode, Kerala), the first of several annual International Conferences on Dowry and Bride-Burning in India (1995 sqq.), the yearly Round Tables on the Ethnogenesis of South and Central Asia (1999 sqq) and, since 2005, conferences on comparative mythology (Kyoto, Beijing, Edinburgh, Ravenstein (Netherlands), Tokyo, Harvard, Tokyo).
 as well as at Strasbourg, St.Petersburg, Tübingen and Yerevan.

At the Beijing conference he founded the International Association for Comparative Mythology.

California textbook controversy over Hindu history

In 2005, Witzel joined other academics and activist groups to oppose changes to California state school history textbooks proposed by US-based Hindu groups, mainly The Vedic Foundation and Hindu Education Foundation (HEF), arguing that the changes were not of a scholarly but of a religious-political nature. He was appointed to an expert panel set up to review the changes and helped draft the compromise edits that were later adopted.

Witzel's efforts received the support of academics and some community groups,
but attracted severe criticism  from those supporting the original changes, who questioned his expertise on the subject and his appointment to the expert panel.

Witzel was issued a subpoena by the California Parents for Equalization of Educational Materials (CAPEEM), a group founded specifically for the schoolbook case, in November 2006 to support their law case against the California authorities' decisions in the textbook case. He was sued by CAPEEM to compel with the subpoena in Massachusetts courts, which was however dismissed twice. He had already submitted documents to CAPEEM and undergone a deposition.

Witzel was also accused of being biased against Hinduism, an allegation he denies.
In an interview with rediff India abroad Senior editor Suman Guha Mazumder, Witzel acknowledged that the intentions of the Hindu Education Foundation and Vedic Foundation to correct misrepresentations of Hinduism were good, but the way they went about it was sectarian, narrow, and historically wrong.

Rejecting criticism that he was a "Hindu hater", Witzel said, " I always get misrepresented that I'm a hindu hater but I'm not. I hate people who misrepresent history."

The HEF campaign was dismissed by critics as "one driven by the sectarian agenda of the Sangh Parivar, a term commonly used to describe the Hindu nationalist triumvirate of India's Bharatiya Janata Party, the Rashtriya Swayamsevak Sangh and the Vishwa Hindu Parishad." In a letter to the Board of Education, Vinay Lal, a history professor at the University of California at Los Angeles, wrote:

Works

Books

Articles

Notes

References

External links
 Personal homepage
 'I am not a Hindu hater'. An interview with Michael Witzel. Archived from the original.

1943 births
Living people
American Indologists
Sanskrit grammarians
Historical linguists
American philologists
German philologists
Harvard University faculty
Fellows of the American Academy of Arts and Sciences
German emigrants to the United States
American Sanskrit scholars
People from Świebodzin
People from the Province of Brandenburg
German Indologists
German male non-fiction writers
German Sanskrit scholars
Linguists of Indo-Aryan languages
Paleolinguists